Kappa Mensae, Latinized from κ Mensae,  is a solitary star in the southern circumpolar constellation Mensa. Its distance of 296 light years based on its parallax shift gives it an apparent magnitude of 5.45, making it faintly visible to the naked eye.

Kappa Mensae has a stellar classification of B9 V, indicating that it is an ordinary B-type main-sequence star. The star is very young at the age of 115 million years, having completed only 33.7% of its main sequence lifetime.

References

B-type main-sequence stars
Mensa (constellation)
Mensae, Kappa
Mensa, 32
040593
27566
2129
Durchmusterung objects